Tropidoturris vizcondei is a species of sea snail, a marine gastropod mollusk in the family Borsoniidae.

Distribution
This marine species occurs in the Mozambique Channel.

References

 Morassi M. & Bonfitto A. (2013) Four new African turriform gastropods (Mollusca: Conoidea). Zootaxa 3710(3): 271–280

External links
 
 Biolib.cz: image of Tropidoturris vizcondei

vizcondei
Gastropods described in 2013